Matchett Herring Coe (1907–1999) was an American sculptor active in Texas.

Coe was born in Loeb (now Lumberton), Texas and lived in the Beaumont area most of his life. He graduated from Lamar College, attended Cranbrook Educational Community and served with the Seabees on Guadalcanal during World War II, but was active as a sculptor before the war.  His works have been featured at the Metropolitan Museum in New York, the Carnegie Museum in Pittsburgh, and the Corcoran Gallery of Art in Washington, D. C.

Several of his best known works include his 1936 commissioned sculpture of Confederate hero Richard W. Dowling at Sabine Pass, Texas for the Texas Centennial.  Coe also created the 1961 statue of the Texas Confederate Veteran featured at the Vicksburg National Military Park in Mississippi.

Work 

 friezes and other work at Jefferson County Court House, Beaumont, Texas, 1931
 reliefs of workers and business people, First National Bank Building (Beaumont, Texas), 1937
 architectural sculpture for the Houston City Hall (with Raoul Josset), 1939-1939
 his cenotaph commemorating school children killed in an explosion at New London, Texas, 1939
 reliefs on the Fondren Library at Rice University
 work at Lamar University
 entrance pylons, work on the Reptile House, and other work at the Houston Zoo

Sources
 Coe biography
 on the Dowling statue

1907 births
1999 deaths
American architectural sculptors
American male sculptors
People from Beaumont, Texas
Seabees
Lamar University alumni
Cranbrook Educational Community alumni
People from Lumberton, Texas
20th-century American sculptors
Sculptors from Texas
20th-century American male artists